The San Joaquin Formation is a  Pliocene epoch geologic formation in the lower half of the San Joaquin Valley in central California.

Geology
With the underlying Etchegoin Formation, it is associated with the numerous oil fields in the central and southern San Joaquin Valley. It is overlaid by the Tulare Formation.

It preserves fossils dating back to the Neogene period of the Cenozoic Era.

See also

 
 
 List of fossiliferous stratigraphic units in California
 Paleontology in California

References

Bartow, J.A., 1991, The Cenozoic evolution of the San Joaquin Valley, California: U.S. Geological Survey Professional Paper 1501, 40 p.
Goudkoff, P.P., 1943, Correlation of oil field formations on west side of San Joaquin Valley, in Jenkins, O.P., ed., Geologic formations and economic development of the oil and gas fields of California: San Francisco, Calif., State of California, Department of Natural Resources, Division of Mines Bulletin No. 118, p. 247-252.

Neogene California
Geology of Fresno County, California
Geology of Kern County, California
Geography of Kings County, California
Geography of the San Joaquin Valley
Pliocene geology
Oil fields in Kern County, California